The 1979 Southeastern Conference baseball tournament was held at Dudy Noble Field in Starkville, Mississippi, from May 11 through 13.  won the tournament and earned the Southeastern Conference's automatic bid to the 1979 NCAA tournament.

Regular season results

Tournament

All-Tournament Team

See also 
 College World Series
 NCAA Division I Baseball Championship
 Southeastern Conference baseball tournament

References 

 SECSports.com All-Time Baseball Tournament Results
 SECSports.com All-Tourney Team Lists

Tournament
Southeastern Conference Baseball Tournament
Southeastern Conference baseball tournament
Southeastern Conference baseball tournament
College sports tournaments in Mississippi
Baseball competitions in Mississippi
Sports in Starkville, Mississippi